William Wilson (born c. 1947) is a Scottish former football player and manager.

Wilson played as a winger, starting his playing career at Kilsyth Rangers, where he won the Scottish Junior Cup in 1967 before moving up to the senior level with Airdrieonians along with Drew Jarvie. He was with the Diamonds for twelve years, making 279 appearances in the Scottish Football League and playing in the 1975 Scottish Cup Final (he was later voted into the club's 'Greatest Ever XI' in 2016). He left Airdrie in 1979 to join Cumbernauld United and subsequently became manager of Kilsyth Rangers. Wilson was manager of Albion Rovers during the 1983/84 season.

References

Year of birth missing (living people)
Living people
Scottish footballers
Place of birth missing (living people)
Association football wingers
Scottish Junior Football Association players
Scottish Junior Football Association managers
Kilsyth Rangers F.C. players
Airdrieonians F.C. (1878) players
Cumbernauld United F.C. players
Scottish Football League players
Albion Rovers F.C. managers
Scottish Football League managers
Scottish football managers